Isidro J. R. Vicera (born 30 March 1970) is a Filipino boxer. He competed in the men's flyweight event at the 1992 Summer Olympics.

References

External links
 

1970 births
Living people
Filipino male boxers
Olympic boxers of the Philippines
Boxers at the 1992 Summer Olympics
People from Negros Occidental
Flyweight boxers